The Royal Monmouthshire Royal Engineers (Militia) is the most senior regiment of the British Army Reserve. The regiment was formed in 1539 during the reign of by King Henry VIII, making it the second oldest regiment of the British Army (The Honourable Artillery Company was formed in 1537). The R Mon RE (M) became a militia unit in 1660 and then became a part of the Royal Engineers in 1877.

History

The two 'Royals' 
The regiment was formed as a posse comitatus in 1539 during the reign of by King Henry VIII; it went on to become a trained band and then a militia unit in 1660. It is unique in having the word 'Royal' appear twice in its name. It gained the first Royal in 1804 when it was the Monmouth and Brecon Militia. The second was acquired in 1877 when the regiment transferred from an infantry unit into a Special Reserve section of the expanding Royal Engineers.

On 1 April 1967, the existing regiment absorbed 43rd Wessex Division RE (TA), 48th South Midland Division RE (TA) and 53rd Welsh Division RE (TA).

Seniority dispute with the Honourable Artillery Company 

The records of the Honorable Artillery Company (HAC) indicate that it was formed two years prior to the Royal Monmouthshire Royal Engineers (Militia). However, in 1930 the Army Council (Army Board from 1964) reviewed the Army's precedence table and King George V agreed that, on account of its status as a militia unit, the Royal Monmouthshire Royal Engineers (Militia) were the senior regiment. In 1957 the matter was investigated further and Queen Elizabeth II also agreed that the Royal Monmouthshire Royal Engineers (Militia) were the senior regiment:
From:-Lieut.-Colonel The Rt. Hon. Sir Michael Adeane, K.C.B., K.C.V.O . Private Secretary to the Queen, Buckingham Palace, S.W.1. 12th March, 1957.

My dear Playfair,
Thank you for your letter of 8th March which I have laid before The Queen and which Her Majesty has read with interest.
I am to say that the recommendation of the Honours and Distinctions Committee with regard to the relative precedence of the Royal Monmouthshire Royal Engineers and the Honourable ArtiIlery Company meets with the Queen's approval.

Yours sincerely,
M. E. ADEANE

The Royal Jersey Militia 

The Jersey Militia were brought under the command of the R Mon RE (M) in 2007.  The Jersey Militia was formed in 1337 when Edward III ordered "all his faithful peoples of the islands" to be prepared - by forming a militia - for possible war with France. The militia defended the island against several pirate raids, and in 1549 against a French invasion attempt.  The militia played a role in the Battle of Jersey, for which its actions gained it the 'Royal' title.

Current organisation 
The current organisation of the regiment is as follows:

 Regimental Headquarters and Headquarters Troop, at Monmouth Castle
 100 (Militia) Field Squadron, at Chapman House, Cwmbran
1 Troop, at Artillery Grounds, Bristol
Cardiff Troop
 108 (Welsh) Field Squadron (Militia), at John Chard VC House, Swansea
 225 (City of Birmingham) Field Squadron (Militia), at Gundolph House, Oldbury
 1 Troop, at Baskeyfield House, Stoke-on-Trent
 2 Troop, in Cannock
Jersey Field Squadron (Royal Militia of the Island of Jersey), in Saint Helier, Jersey
 Guernsey Troop, at Saint Peter Port, Guernsey

Regimental museum

The regimental museum of the Royal Monmouthshire Royal Engineers is in Monmouth Castle.

Notable Officers

 Jules Hudson, television producer and presenter, best known for presenting the BBC series Escape to the Country.

Order of precedence

References

External links

Regimental/Museum/Trust & Dining Club site
Official site
Regimental Museum
Royal Engineers Museum - Militia, Volunteers and Territorials (1757–1979)

1539 establishments in England
History of Monmouthshire
Regiments of the Royal Engineers
Military units and formations in Monmouthshire
Military units and formations in Wales
Monmouthshire
Monmouthshire
Monmouth, Wales
Military units and formations established in the 16th century
16th-century establishments in Wales